Frederick Lee Shepherd (September 16, 1923 – October 8, 1988), nicknamed "Tubhead", was an American Negro league outfielder in the 1940s.

A native of Columbus, Georgia, Shepherd attended Morris Brown College and played for the Atlanta Black Crackers in 1944. He died in Miami, Florida in 1988 at age 65.

References

External links
Baseball statistics and player information from Baseball-Reference Black Baseball Stats and Seamheads

1923 births
1988 deaths
Atlanta Black Crackers players
Baseball pitchers
Baseball players from Columbus, Georgia
20th-century African-American sportspeople
Stamford Bombers players